Finnish Afghans are people from Afghanistan living in Finland. As of 2021, there are a total of 12,044 people of Afghan background residing in Finland.

Migration
In late 2015, about half of all the asylum seekers in Finland were Afghans, of which most have arrived through Sweden to Tornio. A large portion of Afghans in Finland are ethnic Hazaras. In 2018, Migri temporarily froze all Afghani applications. Deportations of Afghani asylum seekers has drawn criticism in Finland and other European countries. In 2018, 62% of Afghans asylum seekers received an asylum in Finland.

On 9 July 2021, Finland halted deportations to Afghanistan after the US withdrawal from Afghanistan. In August 2021, in the aftermath of the 2021 Taliban offensive, Finland evacuated a total of 330 people from Afghanistan to Finland during a ten-day operation. 250 of them were Finnish citizens, people with residence permits in Finland, people who had worked at the Finnish Embassy in Kabul and their family members. 80 of them were Finland's quota evacuees consisting of Afghan workers for the European Union and NATO and their family members. A day after the operation, the total number of evacuees increased to 413 when 83 Finnish Embassy's security guards and their family members were evacuated to Finland with the help of the United States.

Organizations
Association of Finnish Afghan Associations.

Notable people

 Fareed Sadat, footballer
 Mosawer Ahadi, footballer
 Moshtagh Yaghoubi, footballer
 Nasima Razmyar, politician

See also
 Afghan diaspora

References

Ethnic groups in Finland
 
Muslim communities in Europe